Odderøya Lighthouse is a coastal lighthouse located on the southwestern coast of the island of Odderøya in Kristiansand municipality in Agder county, Norway. The lighthouse was first built in 1832.  The lighouse was replaced in 1874.  That second lighthouse was deactivated in 1984 and a new, automated lighthouse was built adjacent to the historic one, which is still standing.  The second Odderøya Lighthouse is listed and protected by law by the Norwegian Directorate for Cultural Heritage.

Present lighthouse
The concrete, cylindrical tower is white with a red stripe around it and a red roof. The occulting light occurs twice every eight seconds.

The lighthouse is open to visitors on weekends from mid June to mid August and only Sundays from the middle of August and throughout October. Then you can buy coffee, muffins and soup.

Historic lighthouse
The historic lighthouse is located right next to the present active lighthouse. The historic one was built in 1874, replacing the 1832 lighthouse. This historic lighthouse has been inactive since 1984. A fog bell is attached to the front of the tower. The building is now owned by the city of Kristiansand.

See also

Lighthouses in Norway
List of lighthouses in Norway

References

External links
 Norsk Fyrhistorisk Forening 

Lighthouses completed in 1832
Lighthouses in Agder
Listed lighthouses in Norway
Buildings and structures in Kristiansand